Ochrocladosporium is a genus of fungi belonging to the family Coniothyriaceae.

The species of this genus are found in Europe and Northern America.

Species:

Ochrocladosporium adansoniae 
Ochrocladosporium elatum 
Ochrocladosporium frigidarii

References

Pleosporales
Dothideomycetes genera